Dreams Have No Titles is an art exhibition by Zineb Sedira shown in the French pavilion of the 2022 Venice Biennale.

Further reading 

 
 
 
 
 
 
 https://www.artsy.net/article/artsy-editorial-zineb-sedira-pays-homage-1960s-algerian-cinema-post-liberation

April 2022 events in Italy
59th Venice Biennale
Solo art exhibitions